The 1997 Dartmouth Big Green football team was an American football team that represented Dartmouth College during the 1997 NCAA Division I-AA football season. Dartmouth finished second in the Ivy League.

In their sixth season under head coach John Lyons, the Big Green compiled an 8–2 record and outscored opponents 208 to 165. William Harper, Lloyd Lee and Zachary Walz were the team captains.

The Big Green's 6–1 conference record placed second in the Ivy League standings. Dartmouth outscored Ivy opponents 116 to 103.

Dartmouth played its home games at Memorial Field on the college campus in Hanover, New Hampshire.

Schedule

References

Dartmouth
Dartmouth Big Green football seasons
Dartmouth Big Green football